Buxtehude is a railway station in northwestern Germany. The station is located in the town of Buxtehude.

Train services

Regular commuter trains from Stade and regional trains from Cuxhaven to Hamburg call at the station. The Bremerhaven to Buxtehude service, which is operated by EVB, terminates at Buxtehude since late 2007. On the same date, the Cuxhaven to Hamburg service became a Metronom service.

The station is served by trains of the Hamburg S-Bahn line S3.

The station is served by the following services:

Regional services  Cuxhaven - Otterndorf - Stade - Buxtehude - Hamburg
Local services  Cuxhaven - Bremerhaven - Bremervörde - Buxtehude
Hamburg S-Bahn services  ''Stade - Buxtehude - Hamburg - Pinneberg

See also
 List of Hamburg S-Bahn stations

References

External links

Hamburg S-Bahn stations
Railway stations in Lower Saxony
Eisenbahnen und Verkehrsbetriebe Elbe-Weser
Buildings and structures in Stade (district)
Railway stations in Germany opened in 1881